Frank Kelly (8 September 1921 – 27 December 1974) was an Australian rules footballer who played with Footscray in the Victorian Football League (VFL).

Notes

External links 

1921 births
1974 deaths
VFL/AFL players born outside Australia
Australian rules footballers from Victoria (Australia)
Western Bulldogs players